The 2001–02 OPJHL season is the ninth season of the Ontario Provincial Junior A Hockey League (OPJHL). The thirty-six teams of the North, South, East, and West divisions competed in a 49-game schedule.

Come February, the top eight teams of each division competed for the Frank L. Buckland Trophy, the OPJHL championship.  The winner of the Buckland Cup, the Brampton Capitals, did not attend the 2002 Dudley Hewitt Cup due to a protest staged by the OPJHL against the inclusion of the upstart Superior International Junior Hockey League in the Central Canadian playdowns.

Changes
OPJHL opts out of National Playdowns for one season.
Durham Huskies leave the OPJHL.
Port Hope Clippers are renamed Port Hope Predators.

Final standings

Note: GP = Games played; W = Wins; L = Losses; OTL = Overtime losses; SL = Shootout losses; GF = Goals for; GA = Goals against; PTS = Points; x = clinched playoff berth; y = clinched division title; z = clinched conference title

2001-02 Frank L. Buckland Trophy Playoffs

Division Quarter-final
Wellington Dukes defeated Bancroft Hawks 4-games-to-none
Cobourg Cougars defeated Bowmanville Eagles 4-games-to-none
Trenton Sting defeated Syracuse Jr. Crunch 4-games-to-none
Peterborough Bees defeated Kingston Voyageurs 4-games-to-1
Newmarket Hurricanes defeated Huntsville Wildcats 4-games-to-none
Aurora Tigers defeated Parry Sound Shamrocks 4-games-to-1
Couchiching Terriers defeated Vaughan Vipers 4-games-to-2
Collingwood Blues defeated Stouffville Spirit 4-games-to-3
Wexford Raiders defeated Ajax Axemen 4-games-to-1
St. Michael's Buzzers defeated Oshawa Legionaires 4-games-to-2
Markham Waxers defeated North York Rangers 4-games-to-3
Pickering Panthers defeated Thornhill Rattlers 4-games-to-3
Brampton Capitals defeated Streetsville Derbys 4-games-to-none
Hamilton Kiltys defeated Mississauga Chargers 4-games-to-none
Georgetown Raiders defeated Oakville Blades 4-games-to-none
Bramalea Blues defeated Milton Merchants 4-games-to-2
Division Semi-final
Wellington Dukes defeated Peterborough Bees 4-games-to-none
Cobourg Cougars defeated Trenton Sting 4-games-to-1
Newmarket Hurricanes defeated Collingwood Blues 4-games-to-1
Aurora Tigers defeated Couchiching Terriers 4-games-to-1
Wexford Raiders defeated Pickering Panthers 4-games-to-3
St. Michael's Buzzers defeated Markham Waxers 4-games-to-none
Brampton Capitals defeated Georgetown Raiders 4-games-to-none
Hamilton Kiltys defeated Bramalea Blues 4-games-to-2
Division Final
Brampton Capitals defeated Hamilton Kiltys 4-games-to-2
Wellington Dukes defeated Cobourg Cougars 4-games-to-none
Aurora Tigers defeated Newmarket Hurricanes 4-games-to-none
Wexford Raiders defeated St. Michael's Buzzers 4-games-to-2
Semi-final
Brampton Capitals defeated Aurora Tigers 4-games-to-none
Wellington Dukes defeated Wexford Raiders 4-games-to-3
Final
Brampton Capitals defeated Wellington Dukes 4-games-to-2

Scoring leaders
Note: GP = Games played; G = Goals; A = Assists; Pts = Points; PIM = Penalty minutes

Players selected in 2002 NHL Entry Draft
Rd 7 #211	Patrick Murphy - Edmonton Oilers	(Newmarket Hurricanes)

See also
 2002 Royal Bank Cup
 Dudley Hewitt Cup
 List of OJHL seasons
 Northern Ontario Junior Hockey League
 Superior International Junior Hockey League
 Greater Ontario Junior Hockey League
 2001 in ice hockey
 2002 in ice hockey

References

External links
 Official website of the Ontario Junior Hockey League
 Official website of the Canadian Junior Hockey League

Ontario Junior Hockey League seasons
OPJHL